Cristoforo Canozzi, also called Cristoforo da Lendinara, ( 1426 – after 1477) was an Italian painter of the Renaissance. He was born in Lendinara. Both he and his older brother Lorenzo Canozzi were painters, mosaicists, modellers in terra-cotta, wood-carvers, and printers of books. They flourished at Modena and Padua. He was the author of a Virgin and Child and a Crucifixion with SS. Jerome and Francis in the Gallery of Modena, (1482).

References

1420s births
15th-century Italian painters
Italian male painters
Painters from Padua
Artists from Modena
Renaissance painters
Year of death unknown